Pak Shing Kok is an area in eastern Tseung Kwan O, Hong Kong. The Fire and Ambulance Services Academy is located in Pak Shing Kok.

References

Tseung Kwan O